Dowlatabad (also Romanized as Dowlatābād; also known as Dowlat Abad Hoomeh Zarand) is a village in Mohammadabad Rural District, in the Central District of Zarand County, Kerman Province, Iran. At the 2006 census, its population was 759, in 191 families.

References 

Populated places in Zarand County